William Albert Graham Jr. (born 1943) is an American scholar of Islamic studies and the history of religion, the Murray A. Albertson Professor of Middle Eastern Studies, emeritus, and University Distinguished Service Professor, emeritus, at Harvard University.

Biography
Graham was born August 16, 1943, in Raleigh, North Carolina and raised in Chapel Hill, NC. He earned his B.A. (1966) summa cum laude in comparative literature from the University of North Carolina at Chapel Hill, and his M.A. (1970) and Ph.D. (1973) from Harvard University in the History of Religion specializing in Islamic Studies. Graham joined the Faculty of Arts and Sciences at Harvard in 1973, and became professor of the history of religion and Islamic studies in 1985. He has held Guggenheim and Alexander von Humboldt fellowships and is a fellow of the American Academy of Arts and Sciences and member of the American Philosophical Society. He is the recipient of the quinquennial international prize for contributions to Islamic studies of the International Research Centre for Islamic History, Art and Culture, Istanbul (2000), the lifetime achievement award of the Journal of Law and Religion (2012) and honorary doctorates of humane letters from the University of North Carolina, Chapel Hill (2004) and Lehigh University (2005). He served as Director of Harvard's Center for Middle Eastern Studies (1990–96) and Alwaleed Islamic Studies Program (2016–18); chair of the Department of Near Eastern Languages and Civilizations (1997-2002) and the Committee on the Study of Religion (1987–90); and master of the Harvard College undergraduate residential college of Currier House (1991-2003). He was named Murray A. Albertson Professor of Middle Eastern Studies in 2001, and the following year he joined the Divinity School as its dean, where he served for ten years before returning to full-time teaching in 2012 as a University Distinguished Service Professor.

Selected publications
Divine Word and Prophetic Word in Early Islam (1977)
Beyond the Written Word: Oral Aspects of Scripture in the History of Religion (1987)
Three Faiths, One God (2002)
Islamic and Comparative Religious Studies (2010)
The Heritage of World Civilizations (1986ff.; 10th ed., 2015)

References

External links
[*https://nelc.fas.harvard.edu/people/william-graham 
 
 
 

Harvard University faculty
Harvard Divinity School faculty
Harvard University alumni
University of North Carolina at Chapel Hill alumni
American Islamic studies scholars
1943 births
People from Raleigh, North Carolina
Living people
Members of the American Philosophical Society